An Indian burn, also known as a Chinese burn, is a pain-inducing prank, where the prankster grabs onto the victim's forearm or wrist, and starts turning the skin away from themselves with one hand, and with another hand towards themselves, causing an unpleasant burning sensation to the skin. The prank is popular in a school setting.

Terminology
The prank is known by various different names in the United States, such as Indian sunburn or Indian rug burn, and also as Chinese wrist burn, and as the snake bite. In the United Kingdom, it is known as a Chinese burn.

The term Indian burn possibly comes from the fact that after the prank the skin's color changes to reddish. Another possible explanation is that the name is referencing torture methods attributed to Native Americans.

Variations
A variation of the prank can be done with a yarn that can be rubbed against the skin in a similar manner when starting fire in a small and dried haystack.

Criticism
Some Native Americans disapprove the use of the term Indian burn, including other vocabulary starting with the prefix "Indian-", such as Indian corn, Indian summer and Indian giver, among others.

Statistics
According to a poll carried out in the United Kingdom, with a sample size of 1,844 adults, 27% recalled receiving Indian burns in secondary school.

See also 
 List of practical joke topics
 Wedgie

References

Abuse
Bullying
Pain
Practical jokes
Suffering
Native American topics